The 1992 Görmeç avalanche was an avalanche that occurred on 1 February, 1992, in Görmeç, Şırnak Province in south-east Turkey, killing 97 people including 71 soldiers.

See also 
 List of avalanches

References 

1992
1992 natural disasters
1992 in Turkey
History of Şırnak Province
Gormec
February 1992 events in Europe
1992 disasters in Turkey